The London Conservative Party mayoral selection of 2015 was the process by which the Conservative Party selected its candidate for Mayor of London, to stand in the 2016 mayoral election. Member of Parliament Zac Goldsmith was selected to stand.

Selection process

The Mayoral candidate was selected via an Open primary that was open to all London voters who were on the electoral roll. Voters had to register to vote at a charge of £1.00.

Candidates

 Zac Goldsmith, Member of Parliament for Richmond Park
 Syed Kamall, Member of the European Parliament for London
 Stephen Greenhalgh, Deputy Mayor for Policing and Crime
 Andrew Boff, Member of the London Assembly

Result

See also
2016 London mayoral election

References

Conservative Party (UK)
Mayoral elections in London
London Conservative Party mayoral selection
London Conservative Party mayoral selection
London Conservative Party mayoral selection